Lin Changyi (1803–1876) was a Chinese scholar. He published several collections of poems, many of which criticised the British. Lin was particularly vocal about the opium trade and Christian missionary activity in China.

Early life
Lin was born in 1803 in Houguan, Fuzhou, Fujian. His father was a merchant. Lin became a juren in 1839, but failed to pass the more advanced metropolitan examinations even after eight attempts.

Career
Lin felt personally aggrieved by the gradual decline of the Qing dynasty. Following the signing of the Treaty of Nanking in 1842, which ended the First Opium War, he became more interested in the subject of foreign activity in China, especially in his native Fuzhou, which was one of the five ports that imported foreign goods. 

An anthology of poems that Lin had written before and during the Opium War, titled Shèyīng lóu shīhuà (literally A commentary on poems from the Eagle Shooting Pavilion), was first published in 1851. Lin was "most offended" by the opium trade in China, as well as the Christian missions in China, and he elaborated on the title of his work: 

An interpreter for the British consul in Fuzhou, Charles A. Sinclair, further noted that the word for "eagle" in Chinese and part of the Chinese translation of "England" were homophones. 

In 1853, Lin was awarded a teaching position in Jianning, after impressing the Xianfeng Emperor with his writings. However, Lin quickly resigned after witnessing "malpractices within official circles". In the next two decades, he lectured at the Haimen Academy in Lianzhou, Guangdong. In 1863, he published Yīyǐnshānfáng shījí (literally A poetry anthology from the Yiyinshanfang Studio). The poems in the collection, which were written during his time in Guangdong, revolve around the British presence in China, corruption in the government, inflation, and the Taiping Rebellion. 

Lin had also written an essay on coastal defence in 1833, but only submitted it to the Xianfeng Emperor two decades later, following several revisions. Two more poetry anthologies, Hǎitiān qínsī lù (literally A poetry commentary from the lute-playing pleasure-boat) and its sequel Hǎitiān qínsī xùlù, were published in 1864 and 1869 respectively. In his later poems, Lin continued to express anti-British sentiments, but also remarked positively about Western inventions such as the steam locomotive. His 1866 treatise, Yànguì xùlù, covered a range of topics from astronomy to medicine to technology.

Views

Christianity
Lin was highly critical of Christianity. He believed that Christian missionaries in China were targeting "stupid and ignorant people" with tracts "composed in the most extravagantly foolish style". He was especially opposed to the negative sentiment that Christians had towards ancestor veneration in China: "What person with any human
decency would relinquish the worship of his ancestors?" 

Lin opined that the Ten Commandments "ridiculed" the writings of Confucius and Mencius. He also likened the reported miracles of Jesus to Daoist magic:

Opium
Lin emphasised the economic ruin that the trade of opium had brought to China. He wrote that the British were "barbarians" who would incur the "wrath of Heaven and the universal rage of mankind". The irony of the ban of opium in England was not lost on Lin: "Does not so much deliberate barbarity and cruelty bill one with feelings of injustice and lawful anger?"

References

Citations

Bibliography

 
 
 

1803 births
1876 deaths
People from Fuzhou
19th-century Chinese writers